The 2003 Houston Bowl was a post-season college football bowl game between the Navy Midshipmen and the Texas Tech Red Raiders on December 30, 2003, at Reliant Stadium in Houston, Texas. It was the fourth time the Houston Bowl was played and the final game of the 2003 NCAA Division I FBS football season for both teams. Texas Tech defeated Navy 38–14.

The Houston Bowl was Navy's first bowl game since the 1996 Aloha Bowl, in which Navy defeated California 42–38. Texas Tech, representing the Big 12 conference, was playing in its fourth straight bowl game, stretching back to the inaugural Houston Bowl (then the Galleryfurniture.com Bowl).

References 

Houston Bowl
Houston Bowl
Navy Midshipmen football bowl games
Texas Tech Red Raiders football bowl games
2003 in sports in Texas
December 2003 sports events in the United States
2003 in Houston